The 2022 FIA European Rallycross Championship was the 47th season of the FIA European Rallycross Championship. The championship consisted of two classes: RX1 and RX3.

The championship began on 21 May at the Nyirád Racing Center in Hungary, and ended on 14 November at Nürburgring in Germany.

Calendar 
The championship consisted of seven events across Europe, with RX1 competing at six rounds and RX3 competing at five.

The updated calendar was released on 21 March. It included one unconfirmed event.

Entries

RX1

RX3

Championship standings
Points are scored as follows:

RX1 Driver's Championship

RX3 Driver's Championship

Notes

References

External links 

 

European Rallycross Championship seasons
European Rallycross Championship
Rallycross Championship